Jeremy Sheffield (born 17 March 1966) is an English actor and former ballet dancer. He is most noted for his roles in Holby City, Murder in Suburbia and Hollyoaks on television, as well as in the films Creep and The Wedding Date.

Life and career
Sheffield was born in Chelmsford, Essex. The second son of Brenda (née Dare) and Barry Sheffield, Sheffield trained as a ballet dancer at the Royal Ballet School, graduating into the Royal Ballet, and also dancing with Northern Ballet Theatre. Roles with the Royal Ballet included Aria in The Spirit of Fugue, Paris in Romeo and Juliet, Benno in Swan Lake, He in My Brother, My Sisters, Wilfred in Giselle, Rakitin in A Month in the Country and Mouse King in The Nutcracker.

He appeared as a dancer in Queen's music video for "I Want to Break Free" in 1984, performing in a pastiche of the ballet L'après-midi d'un faune. However, his ballet career ended at the age of 27 due to a broken toe and torn ligament. He had a prominent (non-dancing) music video role several years later when he played the male lead in the video for Natalie Imbruglia's debut single "Torn" in 1997.

Since then, Sheffield has been in the BBC medical drama series Holby City where he played Alex Adams from 2000 to 2003, as well as Lancelot in the 1998 television drama Merlin. He had a supporting role in the 2005 film The Wedding Date alongside Debra Messing and Dermot Mulroney. Subsequently, he made a cameo appearance in the final episode of Green Wing, playing a character that Sue White (played by Michelle Gomez) was dating.

In 2005, he appeared in the British and Irish Renault Clio advert "France vs. Britain" directed by Ridley Scott's daughter Jordan Scott who also directed the 2007 follow up spot "More Va Va Voom" again starring Sheffield as Ben and French actress Annelise Hesme as Sophie. He regularly featured on the BBC's Holiday programme in which he visited Mexico, Egypt, Sichuan, South Africa and Bermuda. In 2006 travelled to South Africa where eight celebrities competed to become rangers in a South African reserve, for the 2007 series of BBC2's Safari School. In the final, Sheffield came second to singing coach Carrie Grant.

In 2007, Sheffield made an appearance in New Tricks. 2008 was a busier year for him with a role in Hotel Babylon and movies  Miss Conception, The Children and Last Chance Harvey.

In January 2010, he took part in ITV show Dancing on Ice alongside professional skater Susie Lipanova. He was the third person to be voted off (therefore finishing the contest in 12th place) after losing in the skate-off.

In October 2011, it was announced that Sheffield would be joining Coronation Street and would portray Danny Stratton. Sheffield's Coronation Street stay was only short as he was part of a storyline that saw Becky McDonald (Katherine Kelly) depart.

In October 2012, it was announced that he would be joining the cast of Hollyoaks to portray Patrick Blake, the biological father of twins Sienna Blake (Anna Passey) and Dodger Savage (Danny Mac). Sheffield left the cast in 2015, with Patrick's exit scenes airing in January 2016.

Personal life
Sheffield is gay, but rarely gives interviews on the subject as he feels it's irrelevant to his career, stating: "I don't feel anybody should have to wear their sexuality on their sleeve, but 99% of the time people make a projection onto me that I'm straight, and I feel that if I just allow them to run with that projection, then it's sort of as if I'm lying. It's a strange position to be in, because I shouldn't have to say anything, but I often do feel like I have to get it into the conversation. It's a shame, but that's how it is."

Filmography

References

External links 
 
 Renault Clio adverts

1966 births
People educated at the Royal Ballet School
English male film actors
English male soap opera actors
English male stage actors
English male ballet dancers
English gay actors
English gay musicians
Living people
Dancers of The Royal Ballet
Royal Shakespeare Company members
English male Shakespearean actors
Actors from Chelmsford
Male actors from Essex
Musicians from Essex
LGBT dancers
20th-century English LGBT people
21st-century English LGBT people